The 1983 Pacific Tigers football team represented the University of the Pacific (UOP) in the 1983 NCAA Division I-A football season as a member of the Pacific Coast Athletic Association.

The team was led by head coach Bob Cope, in his first year, and played their home games at Pacific Memorial Stadium in Stockton, California. On the field, they finished the season with a record of three wins and nine losses (3–9, 1–5 PCAA). The Tigers were outscored by their opponents 211–347 over the season.

After the 1984 season was over, it was discovered that the UNLV Rebels had used multiple ineligible players during both the 1983 and 1984 seasons. As a result, Pacific's loss to UNLV turns into a forfeit win and their record is adjusted to 4–8, 2–4 PCAA.

Schedule

Team players in the NFL
The following UOP players were selected in the 1984 NFL Draft.

Notes

References

Pacific
Pacific Tigers football seasons
Pacific Tigers football